Loriana Kuka (born 5 April 1997) is a Kosovan judoka. She won Judo Grand Prix in Tbilisi (2019), Tashkent (2018) and Antalya (2018). She represented Kosovo in European Games in Minsk and won the bronze medal in -78 kg. She won the bronze medal in 2019 World Judo Championships in Tokyo

In 2021, she won one of the bronze medals in her event at the 2021 Judo World Masters held in Doha, Qatar. She competed in the women's 78 kg event at the 2020 Summer Olympics in Tokyo, Japan.

She won the gold medal in the women's 78 kg event at the 2022 Mediterranean Games held in Oran, Algeria.

Medals record
Source:
2018
 Grand Prix − 78 kg, Antalya
 Grand Prix − 78 kg, Tashkent
 Mediterranean Games − 78 kg, Tarragona

2019
 Grand Prix − 78 kg, Tel Aviv
 Grand Prix − 78 kg, Marrakech
 Grand Prix − 78 kg, Tbilisi
 European Games − 78 kg, Minsk
 World Championships− 78 kg, Tokyo

References

External links
 
 

1997 births
Living people
Kosovan female judoka
Judoka at the 2019 European Games
European Games bronze medalists for Kosovo
European Games medalists in judo
Mediterranean Games medalists in judo
Competitors at the 2018 Mediterranean Games
Competitors at the 2022 Mediterranean Games
Mediterranean Games silver medalists for Kosovo
Judoka at the 2020 Summer Olympics
Olympic judoka of Kosovo